Dalrymple Creek is a locality in the Shire of Hinchinbrook, Queensland, Australia.

Geography 
The Herbert River forms the south-western boundary of the locality and most of the developed land is on the river flats and predominantly used for growing sugarcane. The rest of the locality is mountainous and mostly undeveloped except for a section within the Abergowrie State Forest.

History 
The locality takes its name from the Dalrymple Creek which flows through the locality, a tributary of the Herbert River. The creek in named was named after George Elphinstone Dalrymple, an explorer, public servant and politician.

References 

Shire of Hinchinbrook
Localities in Queensland